Domino is a 1998 album by the British new wave group Squeeze. It was the band's twelfth studio album. After a career struggling with various major record labels, the band decided to record and release Domino independently, on Glenn Tilbrook's own Quixotic Records. Core members Tilbrook and Chris Difford were joined by three brand new Squeeze members for this album: drummer Ashley Soan, bassist Hilaire Penda, and keyboardist Christopher Holland (Jools's younger brother).

The album was hastily made, and received negative reactions from critics. Difford and Tilbrook have both since denounced Domino as a weak effort, marred by time constraints and increasing friction between the two songwriters. Difford chose not to join a 1999 tour due to concerns related to his history of alcoholism, after which Squeeze disbanded. The album did not appear in the UK Albums Chart; their first to fail to do so.

Reception

Stephen Thomas Erlewine of AllMusic was highly dismissive of the record, calling it a "disappointment" and a "dud", further commenting that "all the familiar elements are in place, but nothing really clicks".

Track listing
All songs written by Chris Difford and Glenn Tilbrook.
 "Play On" – 3:39
 "Bonkers" – 3:43
 "What's Wrong with This Picture?" – 3:24
 "Domino" – 4:34
 "To Be a Dad" – 4:10
 "Donkey Talk" – 4:27
 "Sleeping with a Friend" – 4:55
 "Without You Here" – 3:28
 "In the Morning" – 3:34
 "A Moving Story" – 3:11
 "Little King" – 3:33
 "Short Break" – 4:20

Personnel
Squeeze
 Chris Difford – guitars, vocals
 Glenn Tilbrook – vocals, keyboards, programming, loops, guitars 
 Chris Holland – acoustic piano, organ, keyboards, vocals
 Hilaire Penda – bass
 Ashley Soan – drums, vocals

Additional personnel
 Jessica Rowan – recorder (1)
 Nick Harper – guitars (10)
 Sukie Green – additional vocals (5)
 Jeff Harvey – additional vocals (12)

Production
 Glenn Tilbrook – producer, mixing 
 Neil Amor – engineer, mixing 
 Patrick Moore – engineer 
 Roger Wake – mastering at Bourbery-Wake Studios
 Sukie Green – design 
 Jimmy Gaston – front cover photography, additional photography 
 Sandrine Albert – additional photography 
 Simo Bogdanovic – additional photography 
 Julian Woodfield – additional photography

References

External links
 Album summary

1998 albums
Squeeze (band) albums
Albums produced by Glenn Tilbrook